is a Japanese tokusatsu comedy series that began airing April 3, 2007 on TV Tokyo. The story follows a nearly 30-year-old housewife contracted to become a bishōjo superheroine by a kami. The series is a parody of an earlier tokusatsu series titled La Belle Fille Masquée Poitrine and features that show's writer returning. Cospa is featured in several episodes.

Characters
A housewife who in her teens fought monsters as the  but gave up that lifestyle in order to become a normal girl once again. When the kami reappears, she is unsure at first, but then agrees to become the Socialite Belle Panchanne to fight the new monsters that threaten the life of her Kami-sama and her family. If her identity were to be revealed, she is told that she would transform into a sea cucumber in a fish tank. Also, when first confronting the villain, she will say a verse from a Japanese poem.
To transform into Panchanne, Yumiko calls out . Panchanne's catchphrase is 
Panchanne wields a baton, with which she can perform her  which allows her to subdue villains. Her  purifies the hearts of villains.
 Yumiko's husband who initially is thought to be unaware of his wife's alteregos. However, later in the series it is revealed that before the series began he met her Kami-sama in a bar who revealed to him that she was previously Florence. After overhearing Yumiko complaining of not having an exciting life and reminiscing of her days as Florence, he pays Kami-sama to turn her into a superheroine, again.
 Kensuke's younger brother who works as a police officer in the town they live in. He continually tries to discover the identity of Panchanne, often accusing other women in the community. This usually angers Yumiko to the point where she will physically beat Kiyoshi for not believing that she is in fact Panchanne.
 The daughter of Yumiko and Kensuke. Her powers as Panchanne-Mini are similar and weaker than Panchanne's, but she has her own .
 A Shinto deity who previously gave Yumiko her powers as Florence and gives them to her once more as Panchanne. He has lost all of his dignity as a kami, and has resorted to swindling people out of their money. He is also very short, even shorter than Yumiko.

Episodes

Cast
Yumiko Shinjō/Socialite Belle Panchanne - 
Kenske Shinjō - 
Kiyoshi Shinjō - 
Risa Shinjō/Socialite Belle Panchanne-Mini - 
Kami-sama -

Songs
Opening theme
"Happiness & Tenderness"
Lyrics: 
Composition & Arrangement: Takayuki Negishi
Artist: Haruna Yabuki
Ending theme
"Fellow"
Lyrics: 
Composition & Arrangement: GEN
Artist: Rain Note

Notes

External links
Panchanne.com
TV Tokyo's Panchanne website

2007 Japanese television series debuts
2007 Japanese television series endings
Magical girl parodies
Tokusatsu television series
TV Tokyo original programming
Fictional Japanese police officers